McMurdy Hill is a mountain located in the Catskill Mountains of New York south-southwest of Harpersfield. Jaclyn Hill is located northeast, Gunhouse Hill is located north, and Oak Hill is located south of McMurdy Hill.

References

Mountains of Delaware County, New York
Mountains of New York (state)